Mirka Yemendzakis (died August 2, 2013) was a Greek actress, musician, voice coach and director based at the National Theatre of Greece in Athens. She collaborated with Peter Brook, Peter Oskarson and Robert Wilson, as well as eight years with Peter Stein at the Berliner Schaubühne.

Bibliography 
 Jedes Kind Kann Singen (with Michaela Hefele)

References 

Greek musicians
Greek actresses
Voice coaches
Year of birth missing
2013 deaths